The Culbertson House in Ashland, Kentucky is an Italianate-style house built in 1876.  It is located at 1520 Chestnut Dr.  It was listed on the National Register of Historic Places in 1979.

It was built by iron industrialist Thomas Means for his daughter.  It is larger than most houses of its era in the area, has "is encrusted
with an unusually profuse variety of Italianate features."

References

Houses on the National Register of Historic Places in Kentucky
Italianate architecture in Kentucky
Houses completed in 1876
Ashland, Kentucky
National Register of Historic Places in Boyd County, Kentucky
1876 establishments in Kentucky
Houses in Boyd County, Kentucky